Federal Polytechnic may refer to:

Nigeria
 Federal Polytechnic, Ado-Ekiti, Ekiti State
 Federal Polytechnic, Bauchi, Bauchi State
 Federal Polytechnic Bida, Niger State
 Federal Polytechnic, Ede, Osun State
 Federal Polytechnic, Idah, Kogi State
 Federal Polytechnic, Ilaro, Ogun State
 Federal Polytechnic, Ile-Oluji, Ondo State
 Federal Polytechnic, Kaura-Namoda, Zamfara State
 Federal Polytechnic, Mubi, Adamawa State
 Federal Polytechnic Nasarawa, Nasarawa State
 Federal Polytechnic, Nekede, Imo State
 Federal Polytechnic, Offa, Kwara State
 Federal Polytechnic, Oko, Anambra State
 Federal Polytechnic, Ukana, Akwa Ibom State
 Yaba College of Technology, renamed in 1979-1980 as Federal Polytechnic Yaba

Switzerland
ETH Zurich, previously Federal Polytechnic Institute

See also

 List of polytechnics in Nigeria